Kirsty Carline (née Broughton) is a New Zealand netball coach and retired netball player. Carline is the daughter of prominent netball coach Robyn Broughton, a former Silver Ferns assistant coach and head coach of the Southern Sting and Southern Steel, and presently head coach of the Central Pulse.

Carline represented her home province of Southland, along with Otago and Wellington at the National Provincial level and in her later years played fours seasons under her mother at the Southern Sting in the National Bank Cup, winning three titles, from four seasons. She retired after the 2001 domestic season, later taking up a teaching job at Southland Girls' High School. Carline has also coached the Southland U21 team.

References
 2001 National Bank Cup squads
 Juggling life tough job for hotshot
 Sting in wars as Force's hopes rise

New Zealand netball players
Living people
Year of birth missing (living people)
Southern Sting players